Karl Wallinius (born 14 January 1999) is a Swedish handball player for THW Kiel and the Swedish national team.

Achievements 
 DHB-Supercup
 : 2022

References

1999 births
Living people
Swedish male handball players
Sportspeople from Lund
Lugi HF players
Montpellier Handball players
THW Kiel players
Expatriate handball players
Swedish expatriate sportspeople in France
Swedish expatriate sportspeople in Germany
Handball-Bundesliga players